Fire Walker is a public art sculpture in South Africa, Johannesburg in the inner city.  The piece is located on Sauer and Simmonds Street, off of the Queen Elizabeth Bridge.  The sculpture represents a woman carrying a brazier on her head in commemoration of the activity which took place in the area in recent years, when ladies would prepare and sell their fires to others preparing food in the surrounding areas.

Designed by William Kentridge and Gerhard Marx, the  sculpture was constructed  of fragmented steel pieces to create the feeling of the figure disintegrating or becoming reassembled, depending on the angle from which it is viewed, hinting at the fragility of spaces and the people who pass through them.

The piece has been called "Johannesburg’s own Statue of Liberty". Fire Walker is one of many pieces found amongst Public Art in Johannesburg.

Resources
 Jozi gets its Statue of Liberty
 Joburg unveils 11-m tall ‘fire walker’ steel sculpture
 Public Art Policy
 Public Art Gallery

Public art in Johannesburg
Outdoor sculptures in South Africa
South African art
Steel sculptures in South Africa
2009 sculptures